Alum Creek is a stream in the U.S. state of West Virginia. It is a tributary of Tug Fork.

The water of Alum Creek is impregnated with alum, hence the name.

See also
List of rivers of West Virginia

References

Rivers of Mingo County, West Virginia
Rivers of West Virginia